The following is a list of head coaches of the Taiwanese basketball team Formosa Taishin Dreamers.

Coaches

Key

Note: Statistics are correct through the end of the 2021–22 P. League+ season.

References